Robert Strąk (born 9 June 1967 in Wałcz) is a Polish politician. He was elected to the Sejm on 25 September 2005, getting 13,859 votes in 26 Gdynia district as a candidate from the League of Polish Families list.

He was also a member of Sejm 2001-2005.

See also
Members of Polish Sejm 2005-2007

External links
Robert Strąk - parliamentary page - includes declarations of interest, voting record, and transcripts of speeches.

1967 births
Living people
People from Wałcz
Members of the Polish Sejm 2005–2007
Members of the Polish Sejm 2001–2005
League of Polish Families politicians